Telugu Titans is a Kabaddi team based in Vishakapatnam and Hyderabad that plays in the Pro Kabaddi League. Telugu Titans is a franchise of Veera Sports owned by Mr. Srinivas Sreeramaneni of Vaya Group, of NED Group and Mr. Mahesh Kolli of Greenko Group. The Titans play their home matches at G. M. C. Balayogi SATS Indoor Stadium when in Hyderabad and at Rajiv Gandhi Indoor Stadium, when in Vishakapatnam. The Titans reached the playoffs of Season 2 and 4 in PKL.In Season 2 Telugu Titans Went to Semi Final But Lost to Benguluru Bulls 38-39.In Season 9 They Signed Best Defender in PKL Manjeet Chillar as Assistant Coach.

Franchise history 

Pro Kabaddi League (PKL) is a professional kabaddi league in India, based on the format of the Indian Premier League T20 cricket tournament. The first edition of the tournament was played in 2014 with eight franchises representing various cities in India.
In 2014, the Titans played three seasons in Vizag and three in Hyderabad.

Current squad 
 Players with international appearances are listed in bold.
  denotes a player who is currently unavailable for selection.
  denotes a player who is unavailable for rest of the season.

Administration and support staff

Seasons

Season I 

Telugu Titans finished fifth in the group stage and did not qualify to the playoffs.

Season II 

Telugu Titans finished third in the group stage and qualified to the playoffs.

Season III

Season IV

Season V

Season VI

Season VII 

Telugu Titans had a poor run this season as they finished eleventh. The team signed Sidharth Desai for ₹1.45 crores. They were led by Iranian defender Abozar Mighani.The team recorded their biggest win of the season against Jaipur Pink Panthers. They defeated them by a margin of 20 points. The top raider of the team was Sidharth who scored 217 points whereas the top defender was Vishal Bhardwaj who scored 62 points. The best all rounder was Farhad Milaghardan with 78 points.

Season VIII

Season IX 

After a disastrous last season where they only won one match out of all possible 22 matches, Telugu Titans decided to only retain Rajnish, Ankit Beniwal and a few other NYP(s) (New Young Player(s)) ahead of the season 9 auction. It was not shocking to any fans because of the last season. Even Rohit Kumar who was the captain last season and their record signing Siddharth Desai are shown the back door. It will be interesting to see how they will use their FBM cards during the auction.

Records

Overall results Pro Kabbaddi season

By opposition 
''Note: Table lists in alphabetical order.

Sponsors

References 

Pro Kabaddi League teams
2014 establishments in Telangana
Kabaddi clubs established in 2014
Sport in Visakhapatnam
2014 establishments in Andhra Pradesh
Sport in Hyderabad, India